Kadri Park is a park located in Kadri Gudde (meaning "hill" in Tulu).  It is the largest park in Mangalore. This park contains a musical fountain and has hosted the Karavali Utsav. The park is famous for flower shows in Mangalore.

Accessibility 
Kadri Park is well connected by public transport. There are several city buses from the main bus stop in statebank and from other regions of the city. It is close to KPT Junction (one of the busiest junctions of Mangalore), Circuit House, Planet SKS (the tallest pure residential building of Karnataka)  & All India Radio Mangalore.

Distance from other major destinations:
Bejai Museum, Mangalore - 1 km
Pumpwell, Mangalore - 4 km
City Centre Mall, Mangalore - 4 km
Forum Fiza Mall, Mangalore - 5 km
New Mangalore Port, Mangalore- 7 km
Pilikula Nisargadhama, Mangalore - 10 km
Panambur Beach,  Mangalore - 11 km
Tannirbhavi Beach, Mangalore- 11 km
National Institute of Technology Karnataka, Surathkal, Mangalore - 16 km
Mangalore Refinery and Petrochemicals Limited - 19 km
Infosys DC, Mudipu, Mangalore - 20 km
Sasihithlu Beach, Mangalore - 23 km
Manipal - 65 km

Nearest Railway Stations:
Mangalore Central railway station, Hampankatta, Mangalore - 5 km
Mangalore Junction railway station, Padil, Mangalore - 5 km
Surathkal railway station, Surathkal, Mangalore - 14 km

Nearest Airport:
 Mangalore International Airport (India) - 11 km

Climate 
Mangalore has a tropical monsoon climate and is under the direct influence of the Arabian Sea branch of the southwest monsoon.

Gallery

See also 
 Mahatma Gandhi Road (Mangalore)
 K S Rao Road
 NITK Beach
 Sasihithlu Beach
 Panambur Beach
 Tannirbhavi Beach
 Ullal beach
 Someshwar Beach
 Pilikula Nisargadhama
 Tagore Park
 St. Aloysius Chapel
 Bejai Museum
 Aloyseum
 Kudla Kudru

References

Parks in Mangalore
Tourist attractions in Mangalore